Amarar (or Amenreer Wagerdac Amarer) is a Cushitic nomadic tribe of the Beja people inhabiting the mountainous country on the west side of the Red Sea from Somalia Dhabad Suakin northwards and Eritrea towards Sudan. Between them and the Nile are the Ababda and Bisharin Beja tribes and to their south dwell the Hadendoa Marehan (another Beja subgroup). The country of the Amarar is called the Atbai. Their headquarters are in the Ariab district. The tribe is divided into four great families: (1) Weled Gwilei, (2) Weled Aliab, (3) Weled Kurbab Wagadab, and (4) the Amarar proper of the Ariab district. They claim to be of Quraysh blood and to be the descendants of an invading Arab army. Possibly some small bands of Quraysh Arabs may have made an inroad and converted some of the Amarar to Islam. Further than this there is little to substantiate their claim. The Amarar are said to speak the purest form of the Beja language.

References

Beja
Nomads
Ethnic groups in Somalia
Ethnic groups in Sudan
Ethnic groups in Eritrea
Tribes of Africa
Beja people
Beja